Mike Disfarmer (born Mike Meyer, 1884–1959) was an American photographer known for his portraits of everyday people in rural Arkansas from the 1920s to the 1950s. His stark, realist photographs were rediscovered in the 1970s and later came to be regarded as works of art. Because of his status outside of the artistic mainstream, Disfarmer's photographs are considered an example of Outsider art.

Biography 
Born Mike Meyer in Indiana, he moved with his family to Arkansas in 1892. He later moved to the town of Heber Springs, Arkansas at the age of thirty, where roughly a decade later he would build and operate his photography studio. Meyer changed his name to Disfarmer while in his 50s, claiming that he was adopted by the Meyers (Disfarmer is a direct reference to Meyer, an archaic German term for farmer). Disfarmer never married, and he lived alone in the photography studio until his death in 1959. While there is speculation that he was eccentric and even insane, so little is known about his personal life that there is no evidence for these assertions other than his photographs.

Photographs
Disfarmer's photographs were simple, postcard-sized glass plate negatives, costing only 50 cents for three photographs. The subjects face directly at the camera and never smile, supposedly told not to by the photographer. His subjects are the small-town residents of Heber Springs as well as tourists, photographed without props against a plain backdrop. Employing a stark realism and often lengthy, unnervingly mute sitting sessions, Disfarmer produced a consistent stream of portraits that, according to some, capture the essence of a particular community and time.

Legacy 

A large cache of negatives shot by Disfarmer were found in the 1970s in Heber Springs by Peter Miller who spent a year on a bicentennial grant cleaning, preserving and cataloging the negatives. Subsequently, two exhibitions of Disfarmer's own prints were held.

In 2008, a picture of Disfarmer was used on the 80th Academy Awards telecast as the alleged portrait of Roderick Jaynes, the film editing pseudonym of the Coen brothers, who was nominated at that ceremony for editing the Coens' film No Country for Old Men. Disfarmer's photo was supplied to the Academy of Motion Picture Arts and Sciences by the Coens after Jaynes' nomination.

In 2009, he was the subject of a puppet-theater production by Dan Hurlin, premiered at St. Ann's Warehouse in New York City. His life was an inspiration for guitarist Bill Frisell, who was commissioned by the Wexner Center for the Arts to write the score to accompany a retrospective of Disfarmer's work. Frisell visited Disfarmer's home town of Heber Springs, Arkansas and created an album "Disfarmer".

His gravesite has been placed on the National Register of Historic Places.

Books
Disfarmer, Mike.  Disfarmer: The Heber Springs Portraits, 1939–1946.  Addison House 
Disfarmer, Mike, Steven Kasher, and Alan Trachtenberg. Original Disfarmer Photographs. Göttingen: Steidl, 2005
Disfarmer, Mike.  Heber Springs Portraits: Continuity and Change in the World Disfarmer Photographed. University of New Mexico Press

References

External links
 Official photo sales website
 Disfarmer (Public Pictures), (Documentary)
 Disfarmer:A Portrait of America, (tvo.org Documentary)
 Photomart Images, (Database)

1884 births
1959 deaths
20th-century American photographers
People from Heber Springs, Arkansas
Photographers from Arkansas
Photographers from Indiana